Mortimer Shuman (12 November 1938 – 2 November 1991) was an American singer, pianist and songwriter, best known as co-writer of many 1960s rock and roll hits, including "Viva Las Vegas". He also wrote and sang many songs in French, such as "Le Lac Majeur", "Papa-Tango-Charly", "Sha Mi Sha", "Un Été de Porcelaine", and "Brooklyn by the Sea" which became hits in France and several other European countries.

Life and career

Shuman was born in Brooklyn, New York, United States, of Polish Jewish immigrants and went to Abraham Lincoln High School, subsequently studying music at the New York Conservatory. He became a fan of R&B music and after he met Doc Pomus the two teamed up to compose for Aldon Music at offices in New York City's Brill Building. Their songwriting collaboration saw Pomus write the lyrics and Shuman the melody, although occasionally each worked on both. Their compositions would be recorded by artists such as Dion, The Flamingos, Andy Williams, Bobby Darin, Fabian, Ajda Pekkan, The Drifters, and Elvis Presley, among others. Their most famous songs include "A Teenager in Love", "Turn Me Loose", "This Magic Moment", "Save The Last Dance For Me", "Little Sister", "Can't Get Used to Losing You", "(Marie's the Name) His Latest Flame", "Viva Las Vegas" and "Sweets for My Sweet".

With the advent of the British invasion, they moved to London where they penned songs for a number of British musicians. After the partnership with Doc Pomus ended in 1965, Shuman moved to Paris, France, where he wrote songs for Johnny Hallyday and embarked on his own recording career. One of his hits in the early 1970s was "(Il Neige Sur) Le Lac Majeur". He also wrote a couple of hits in the UK (including The Small Faces' "Sha-La-La-La-Lee" and Cilla Blacks' "Love's Just A Broken Heart", both co-written with Kenny Lynch), as well as a musical, Budgie (lyrics by Don Black). With the Welsh songwriter Clive Westlake, he wrote "Here I Go Again", which was recorded by The Hollies. Billy J. Kramer enjoyed success with another Shuman song, "Little Children".

In 1968, Shuman teamed with Eric Blau and adapted the French lyrics of songs by the Belgian composer Jacques Brel used as the basis of the successful off-Broadway production Jacques Brel is Alive and Well and Living in Paris. Some of the songs from the show were subsequently recorded by Scott Walker, including "Jackie" and "Mathilde", and by David Bowie, including "My Death" and "Amsterdam". Shuman appeared in both the stage revue and the 1975 film adaptation. This was followed the next year with work on the soundtrack of the film Sex O'Clock U.S.A., which is notable for featuring one of the earliest known gay songs, "You're My Man," while another one of his compositions from the soundtrack, "Baby Come On" (billed under the Sex O'Clock U.S.A. name during its chart run) become a modest hit on Billboard's Disco chart, peaking at number 37 in July 1977. He also did many collaborations with the Israeli singer Mike Brant, and composed film scores, often French movies, including A Day at the Beach (1970), Romance of a Horsethief (1971), Black Thursday (1974), À nous les petites Anglaises (1976), Monsieur Papa (1977) and The More It Goes, the Less It Goes (1977).

Shuman was elected to the Songwriters Hall of Fame in 1992. He also worked occasionally as an actor, notably appearing with Jodie Foster in The Little Girl Who Lives Down the Lane (for which he was also musical supervisor).

He died of cancer on 2 November 1991, leaving his wife, Maria-Pia and their four daughters, Maria-Cella, Barbara, Maria-Pia and Eva-Maria. Doc Pomus had died in March of the same year.

Awards and honors
Shuman was named one of the 2010 recipients of the Ahmet Ertegun Award from the Rock and Roll Hall of Fame. He joined his early collaborator Doc Pomus, who was inducted in 1992.

Selected discography 
 Albums
 Imagine (1976) - certified  Record
 À Nous Les Petittes Anglaises! (1990)
 Distant Drum (1991)

 Singles
 "Le Lac Majeur" (1973) (a Number One hit in the Netherlands)
 "La splendeur de Rome" (1974)
 "Imagine" (1976)
 "Machines" (1980)

Selected filmography 
(As composer unless otherwise stated)
 A Day at the Beach (1970)
 Romance of a Horsethief (1971)
 Black Thursday (1974)
 Jacques Brel is Alive and Well and Living in Paris (1975) (Actor and lyricist)
 The Little Girl Who Lives Down the Lane (1976) (Actor)
 A Guy Like Me Should Never Die (1976) (Actor and composer)
 Let's Get Those English Girls (1976)
 Game of Seduction (1976) 
 A Real Young Girl (1976)
 High Street (1976) (Actor and composer)
 La Nuit de Saint-Germain-des-Prés (1977) (Actor and composer)
 The More It Goes, the Less It Goes (1977) (Actor and composer)
 Monsieur Papa (1977)
 Holiday Hotel (1978)
 The Associate (1979)
 Psy (1981)
 Cent Francs L'amour (1986)

References

Notes
Bloom, Ken. American song. The complete musical theater companion. 1877–1995, Vol. 2, 2nd edition, Schirmer Books, 1996.
Larkin, Colin. The Encyclopedia of Popular Music, Third edition, Macmillan, 1998.
Stambler, Irwin. Encyclopedia of Pop, Rock and Soul, St. Martin's Press, 1974.

External links
Mort Shuman Dies Obituary in The New York Times, 4 November 1991 (retrieved 22 January 2010)

1938 births
1991 deaths
Songwriters from New York (state)
Jewish American musicians
Jewish American songwriters
Musicians from Brooklyn
French-language singers of the United States
American expatriates in France
American expatriates in the United Kingdom
Philips Records artists
American people of Polish-Jewish descent
20th-century American singers
Abraham Lincoln High School (Brooklyn) alumni
Deaths from cancer in England
20th-century American male singers
20th-century American Jews
American male songwriters